The Jaguar XK is an inline 6-cylinder dual overhead camshaft (DOHC) engine produced by Jaguar Cars between 1949 and 1992. Introduced as a 3.4-litre, it earned fame on both the road and track, being produced in five displacements between 2.4 and 4.2-litres for Jaguar passenger cars, with other sizes being made by Jaguar and privateers for racing. A de-rated version was also used in certain military vehicles built by Alvis and Daimler.

Early development
Prior to World War II, SS Cars (which changed its name to Jaguar in 1945) used three engines produced by the Standard Motor Company: a 1.5-litre 4-cylinder and 6-cylinder engines of 2.5 and 3.5 litres.  Sir William Lyons and his engine designers; William Heynes (Chief Engineer), Walter Hassan,  Claude Baily, and Harry Weslake are widely reported to have discussed a new range of replacements whilst fire-watching on the roof of the SS factory in Swallow Road, Coventry, during German World War II bombing raids. Rather than developing prototype engines immediately after the war, it is claimed that Jaguar's wartime engine developments went far beyond mere discussion and design, extending to the construction and testing of several prototype engines as early as 1943.

The initial aim was to produce a series of engines of higher than normal output that would be able to stay ahead of the competition without revision for many years and which Sir William insisted also had to "look good".  In 1942-43, a range of configurations was considered and it was concluded that, for good breathing and high bmep, the new engines would need vee-opposed valves operating in hemispherical combustion chambers. Two configurations of this type were selected for comparison in 1943 and the prototypes named "XG" and "XF". The XG 4-cylinder of 1,776 cc, first tested in October 1943, was based on the 1.5-litre Standard block and used its single cam-in-block to operate the opposed valves via a complicated crossover pushrod arrangement, similar to that of the pre-war BMW 328.  The XF 4-cylinder of 1,732 cc used the now familiar dual overhead cam (DOHC) configuration and was first tested in November 1944. The XG was found to suffer from excessive pushrod and rocker noise and gas flow figures through its vertical valve ports did not equal those of the horizontal ports on the XF. Therefore, from these two options, the DOHC XF layout was selected.

4-cyl engine development progressed as follows:
 XG Pushrod engine  73 x 106 x 4    1776 cc                                          May to Nov 1944
 XF  75 x 98 x 4   1732 cc                                                                     Nov 1944 to Jun 1945
 XK1 (first of Heynes’  4 x XJs)  76.25 x 98 x 4     1790 cc                       Oct 1945 to Nov 1946
 XK2  76.25 x 98 x 4          1790 cc                                                       Feb to Sep 1946
 XK3  76.25 x 98 x 4          1790 cc                                                       Dec 1946 to Feb 1947
 XK4  76.25 x 98 x 4          1790 cc                                                       Nov 1946 to Dec 1947
 Gardner Engine   (used in record-breaking MG car)   1970 cc                 1948        
 XK Number 1  3-bearing crank     1970 cc                                             1949-1952
 XK Number 2  3-bearing crank     1970 cc                                             1950-1952
 XK  5-bearing crank                    1970 cc                                             1953

By September 1947 a 3.2-litre 6-cylinder version had been produced, called the "XJ 6-cylinder", which was intended to replace both Standard-based 6-cylinder units.  Testing showed the need for higher torque at low speeds than this engine could produce and hence it was 'stroked' to 3,442 cc to form the "XK 6-cylinder", which saw its debut in an open two-seat XK120 sports car at the 1948 London Motor Show.  Following this the XK6 powered the Jaguar Mark VII and a number of other models in subsequent years.

The XG prototype soldiered on as a component testbed until 1948. There also existed an "XK 4-cylinder" of 1,790 cc, also first tested in October 1945 and remaining under development alongside the XK 6-cylinder units. At the time of William Heynes' paper presented to the IMechE in February 1953, the XK 4-cylinder was still referred to as being under development. It was only finally dropped as a possible production engine later in 1953, by which time it had been realised that Jaguar's image in the market had moved beyond the need for a replacement for the old 1.5-litre Standard 4-cylinder unit.

Because the 6-cylinder XK prototypes were found to be so much more refined than the 4-cylinder versions, in 1951 a 1,986 cc 6-cylinder version of the XK 6-cylinder was built to see if it would suffice as a smaller scale engine. By 1954 this had grown to 2,483 cc and it was this short-block version of the XK 6-cylinder that was fitted to the new compact Jaguar 2.4-litre (retrospectively known as the Mark 1) released in that year.

There are some misleading claims of an intervening "XJ" 4-cyl prototype but it seems the only person who referred to them as such was William Heynes in a paper presented to the IMechE in 1953. Heynes stated there were many 4-cyl variants following the XF but it was he alone who loosely grouped them as XJ. The last mention of XF was in July 1945 and the first mention of XK (XK1) was in October of the same year. This doesn't give much room for a series of XJ engines.There are no mentions of XJ in the archive (other than in Heynes’ paper). If there is a XJ, the first one is likely to have been referred to as XK1 internally. There were three others of nominally 1790 cc capacity called XK2, XK3 & XK4. It is likely these are what Heynes referred to as "XJ". The first "true" XK was called "XK Number 1" (distinct from "XK1") and was of 1970 cc nominal capacity with an 83mm/91mm bore/stroke.

Thus were developed the two block sizes that formed the basis of all subsequent XK 6-cylinder engines; the shorter block being used for the 2.4 and 2.8-litre engines and the full sized block for both versions of the 3.4, the 3.8 and the 4.2-litre engines.

Description

Valve train
The most recognisable feature of the XK engine is the dual cam covers atop the engine, which were a polished alloy until a change to ribbed black and alloy finish in early 1968, four years or so after the introduction of the 4.2-litre versions in 1964. The unusual depth of the engine's cylinder head was dictated by the desire to make room for two generously-sized valves, whilst not excessively restricting the flow of gases into and out of the hemispherical combustion chambers. To satisfy these two conditions, a relatively wide angle between the valves was initially chosen, with quite long valve stems. To efficiently operate valves whose tops were such a long way apart, the dual overhead cam arrangement was found to be the most effective.

The cam lobes act directly on bucket type tappets, which are adjusted by means of shims between the underside of the bucket and the top of the valves. Two duplex chains drive the camshafts, one from the crankshaft to a sprocket at the level of the combustion chambers, and one from the sprocket to each camshaft. The original sprung slipper design of the lower cam chain tensioner proved to be too weak and after a couple of years was changed to an improved hydraulic design, using engine oil pressure.

Cylinder head
The cylinder heads were made of RR50 aluminium alloy due to that material's high rate of heat conduction and light weight, the latter estimated by William  Heynes to give a weight saving of some  compared with a similar head made of cast iron. Special attention was paid to the gas flow, with Harry Weslake and Heynes designing a curved inlet port to impart swirl to the air-fuel mixture for improved combustion. The same basic cylinder head layout was preserved throughout the production life of the engine but with many detail changes. Valve and port sizes and angles, camshaft lift, compression ratio and carburetion were frequently amended from model to model, depending upon whether power or torque was being emphasised.  Very early XK engines fitted to the XK 120 sports car and Mark VII saloon lacked fixing studs at the front part of the cam covers, where they covered the timing chains, which leaked oil as a result.  From 1951 onwards, all XK engines had studs around the full perimeter of the cam covers.

The earliest cylinder heads are known as "Standard" or "A type" heads and are identifiable by their differing valve angles of 30 degrees inlet and 45 degrees exhaust, as well as by their unpainted aluminium finish.  Around 1954, the "B type" head appeared, with equal valve angles of 35 degrees on inlet and exhaust.  The "B type" heads are painted light "duck egg" blue (early cars) to light green (later cars) in the 2.4 and 3.4-litre models and metallic dark blue in 3.8-litre models.  A very few XK 120s and XK 140s were supplied to customers with the "C type" cylinder head, which was painted red and carried a plaque on each cam cover stating "Jaguar Type C".

A supposedly more efficient "straight port" cylinder head, again with equal 35 degree angles on the inlet and exhaust was introduced later in the 1950s and this was painted pumpkin orange on the XK-150S.  The cylinder heads in the Series 1 E-type and Mark X were painted gold whether the engine was a 3.8-litre or 4.2-litre.  Around the time of the later series 1 E-Types and 420G in 1968, about the same time as the arrival of the ribbed cam covers, the practice of painting the cylinder heads ceased.  Many sources still describe the subsequent unpainted aluminium finish as "silver".

Jaguar's colour-coding of its cylinder heads of the late 1950s and early 1960s can be determined from Heiner Stertkamp's list below. The only real anomaly is that the earliest 3.8-litre E-Types had an orange painted head (because they had 3 carburettors) but later changed to gold (because they had straight-port heads). Gold paint signified a straight port triple-carburettor setup from then until the demise of the Mark X.
 Silver/bare aluminium => 3.4 A-type head (Standard XK120, XK140 and MkVII with two H6 carburettors)
 Red => 3.4-litre with C-type head and 2 carburettors (XK 120 C and XK 140SE/M only)
 Light duck egg blue and later light green => 3.4-litre with B-type head and 2 carburettors (may appear as light blue, light green or light blue-green)
 Dark blue metallic => 3.8-litre with B-type head and 2 carburettors
 Orange => 3.4 and 3.8-litre with straight-port head and 3 carburettors 
 Gold => later 3.8-litre and all 4.2-litre (until 420G and Series 2 E-Type) with straight-port head and 3 carburettors

Cars with the straight-port head and only two carburettors did not have painted heads. See the complete table of XK cylinder head types as they relate to Jaguar and Daimler models at the end of this article.

Engine block
The block was made of cast iron (with the exception of some made of aluminium alloy for racing engines), with the crankcase split on the centreline of the seven-bearing crankshaft. The crankshaft was made of EN16 steel, heat treated prior to machining. An innovation was the fitting of a proprietary Metalastik vibration damper on the nose of the crankshaft to eliminate damaging crankshaft resonances. The design and materials of the bottom end of the engine hardly changed throughout its life, apart from the changes dictated by the respaced cylinders of the 4.2-litre version (also used by the 'new 3.4' litre version). The oil pump was changed after a couple of years from a relatively inefficient gear-type pump to a Hobourn-Eaton eccentric-lobe unit.

Fuel system
The pre-injection cars had either two or three SU, Weber, Zenith or Zenith-Stromberg carburettors of various sizes depending upon the model and market, although Weber carburettors were only available from the dealer or on the aftermarket, and not supplied by the factory. The exception to this was 2.4 litre cars up to the introduction of the 240, these earlier cars having twin Solex downdraught carburettors. Some D-Type sports racing cars received fuel injection, but it did not become available on the road cars until 1978, beginning on certain US market models in order to comply with government fuel-efficiency standards. It was eventually extended across the range and to all markets.

Power rating
During the 1950s and 1960s Jaguar released SAE gross horsepower figures, using the measurement system preferred by US manufacturers, as otherwise its cars would have appeared under-powered in comparison with US cars. This practice was superseded by reliance on the more realistic SAE net horsepower system around 1972, although Jaguar power ratings of that era may also be expressed using the very similar DIN net rating system.  Since the conditions upon which the SAE gross figures were determined were not recorded, an objective comparison of the power outputs of the various models of XK6 powered Jaguar over time is impossible.

The 1965 4.2 XK fitted to the carburetted E-Type had a listed output of  SAE gross; the 1986 fuel injected 4.2 XK fitted to the series 3 XJ6 was listed at  DIN net.  Variables such as compression ratio, cam lifts and durations, and fuel consumption rate for each engine during testing would, at a minimum, be additionally required to develop any estimated comparisons.

Individual displacements

3.4-litre

It had an iron block without cylinder liners and aluminium cylinder head. It had a wider gap between cylinders 3 and 4 than between the other cylinders. The 3.4 was first rated at  SAE gross at a compression ratio of 8:1, rising to  SAE gross with the C-type cylinder head (confusingly not the head from the C-Type as raced at Le Mans) all the way to  SAE gross with the "straight port" head at a compression ratio of 9:1 as fitted to the XK150SE.

Almost as soon as the new compact Jaguar 2.4-litre was released, there was pressure on Jaguar to fit the 3.4-litre engine to it. This was duly done in February 1957, the car being known as the Jaguar 3.4-litre. The designation "Mark 1" for these cars was applied retrospectively, after the release of the Mark 2 in 1959.

The original 3.4-litre XK6 was used in the following road cars:
 Jaguar XK120 - 1948-53, "Standard (or "A type")" cylinder head, bare aluminium finish, 2 × SU H6 carburettors. The XK 120 C came with the C-type head (red) as an option from 1951 to 1952 with 2 × SU H8 carburettors. In 1953, the XK 120 C switched to a triple 40 DCOE Weber carburetor setup. The XK 120 SE and M came with the C-type head as an option with 2 × SU H6 carburettors (occasionally SU H8)
 Jaguar XK140 - 1954-57, "Standard (or "A type")" cylinder head, 2 × SU H6 carburettors. The XK 140 SE or M came with the C-type head as an option, painted red with 2 × SU H6 or H8 carburettors
 Jaguar XK 150 3.4 - 1957-61, "B type" cylinder head, painted light blue-green, 2 × SU HD6 carburettors
 Jaguar XK 150 3.4S - 1957-61, "Straight port" cylinder head, painted orange, 3 × SU HD8 carburettors
 Jaguar Mark VII - 1950-54, "A type" then "C type" (as option from April 1953) cylinder head, unpainted aluminium, 2 × SU H6 carburettors
 Jaguar MkVIIM - 1954-57, "C type" cylinder head, 2 × SU H6 carburettors, some had high-lift cams
 Jaguar Mark VIII - 1956–1958, "B type" cylinder head, painted light blue-green, 2 × SU HD6 carburettors
 Jaguar 3.4-litre 'Mark 1' - 1957-59, "B type" cylinder head, painted light blue-green, 2 × SU HD6 carburettors
 Jaguar 3.4-litre Mark 2 - 1959-67, "B type" cylinder head, painted light blue-green, 2 × SU HD6 carburettors
 Jaguar 340 Mark 2 - 1967-68, "B type" cylinder head, ribbed cam covers, 2 × SU HD6 carburettors
 Jaguar S-Type 3.4 - 1963-68, "B type" cylinder head painted light blue-green, smooth cam covers, 2 × SU HD6 carburettors

2.4-litre
In the mid-1950s, Jaguar lacked a compact saloon of the type represented until 1949 by the Standard-engined 1½ litre. In choosing a power unit for its all new compact saloon, Jaguar could choose between the 1,995 cc four-cylinder XK prototype and a downsized version of the 3.4-litre six-cylinder XK. The 4-cylinder was considered too low powered and unrefined. The 3.4 was already well "undersquare", which means that its bore was much less than its stroke, so a smaller bore version of the 3.4 was not seen as a realistic proposition.

Despite having a displacement of almost 2.5 litres, the new car was called the "Jaguar 2.4" to create an obvious separation from the old Standard 2½ litre and link it to the now familiar 3.4-litre XK engine. The 2.4s produced were rated at 112 bhp (nett) by the factory, using twin Solex downdraft carburettors.

In 1959 the engine was carried over into the new Mark 2, in which it produced  SAE gross, still with Solex carburettors. The Jaguar 240 was fitted with an uprated version of the engine, incorporating the straight-port cylinder head and twin SU carburettors delivering 133 bhp SAE gross.

The 2.4-litre XK6 was used in the following cars:
 Jaguar 2.4-litre 'Mark 1' - 1955-59, "B type" cylinder head, unpainted, 2 × Solex B32PB15S carburettors, valve angles 30 degrees inlet, 45 degrees exhaust
 Jaguar 2.4-litre Mark 2 - 1959-67, "B type" cylinder head, unpainted, 2 × Solex B32PB15S carburettors, valve angles 45 degrees inlet and exhaust
 Jaguar 240 Mark 2 - 1967-69, "Straight port" cylinder head, unpainted, 2 × SU HD6 carburettors, valve angles 45 degrees inlet and exhaust

3.8-litre

The 3.8-litre version was released in 1958, initially for the last of the XK150s and the Mark IX saloon. The distance between the cylinder bores was sufficiently small that it was decided to fit dry liners to the bores. The 3.8 had a number of detail differences from the 3.4, particularly in its valve gear and carburetion. The standard 3.8 produced  SAE gross and up to  SAE gross in the XK150SE with the straight port head.

The 3.8-litre XK6 was used in the following road cars:
 Jaguar XK 150 3.8 - 1958-61, "B type" cylinder head, painted dark blue metallic, 2 × SU HD6 carburettors
 Jaguar XK150 3.8S - 1958-61, "Straight port" cylinder head, painted pumpkin orange, 3 × SU HD8 carburettors
 Jaguar Mark IX - 1958-61, "B type" cylinder head, painted dark blue metallic, 2 × SU HD6 carburettors
 Jaguar Mark X 3.8 - 1961-64, "Straight port" cylinder head, painted gold, 3 × SU HD8 carburettors
 Jaguar Mark 2 - 1959-67, "B type" cylinder head, painted dark blue metallic, 2 × SU HD6 carburettors
 Jaguar E-Type Series 1 3.8 - 1961-64, "Straight port" cylinder head, painted orange then gold, 3 × SU HD8 carburettors
 Jaguar S-Type 3.8 - 1963-68, "B type" cylinder head, dark blue metallic or later with smooth cam covers and unpainted, 2 × SU HD6 carburettors
 Panther J.72

3.0-litre

3-litre versions of the XK engine were built from 1959 onwards for FIA sports car racing with a 85 mm (3.35 in) bore and 88 mm (3.46 in) stroke. It was also popular with small race car manufacturers such as Lister Cars who could not afford to produce their own engines. As well as endurance racing, the engine was also used in Formula Libre racing.

A 3.0-litre XK6 was used in the following road cars:
Jaguar E2A prototype sports racer (1960)
Jaguar E-type lightweight sports racer (1961)
Jaguar D-type (non-works) sports racer (1959)
Lister Cars endurance and formula racers
Hersham and Walton Motors (HWM) endurance and formula racers
Cooper Car Company endurance and formula racers
John Tojeiro endurance and formula racers

4.2-litre
A bored-out 4.2-litre version of the XK was officially released in 1964, although racers had been boring the 3.8 out to 4.2 litres for years. The factory 4.2-litre block was a new siamesed sleeve design which used respaced cylinders set evenly along the length of the block with new main bearing spacings and a new crankshaft. The middle two cylinders were moved closer together and the outer two moved further apart but the overall length of the block remained unchanged.

Despite the re-spacing of the cylinder bores, the cylinder head castings remained unchanged. As a result, the centrelines of the combustion chambers in the head no longer aligned precisely with the centrelines of the cylinders but this did not matter greatly as the combustion chamber diameters in the head were smaller than the cylinder diameters. The 3.8 and 4.2-litre cylinder heads and cams are therefore interchangeable. The 4.2-litre engine from the factory had unsmoothed steps between the inlet manifold and head, and the manifold gaskets were not a good match for the inlet ports. These engines therefore make excellent bases for some modification, achieving approx.  SAE net and increased torque merely by "flowing" the head.

Published horsepower ratings of the various versions of the 4.2-litre are complicated by the switch from gross to net horsepower systems during its lifetime. For example, in 1965 the 4.2-litre with triple SU HD8 carburetors fitted to the US-specification E-Type was rated at  @ 5400 rpm SAE gross and a maximum torque of  @ 4000 rpm  whereas by 1969, now with twin Zenith-Stromberg carburetors, this had fallen to  SAE gross. The difference indicates the effect of the revised carburetion and other changes made to reduce exhaust emissions from US specification engines.  Jeff Daniels' reference states that the similar twin Zenith-Stromberg version fitted to a US specification XJ6 was rated by Jaguar at  using the DIN net horsepower system, the difference being largely due to the effect of the gross versus net horsepower rating systems.

The 1987 Jaguar XJ6 was the last Jaguar car fitted with the XK6 engine. In 1992 the last Daimler DS420 Limousine was produced. Like all other DS420 limousines, it was equipped with a 4.2-litre XK6 engine. The 4.2 variant was also used in some military vehicles with relatively few modifications. The XK engine has the rare accolade of having been in production and service in cars spanning six consecutive decades.

All of the 4.2-litre XK engines used the straight port head. After the arrival of the ribbed cam covers in 1967 the heads normally remained unpainted, which some sources describe as "silver".

The 4.2-litre XK6 was used in the following cars:
 Jaguar Mark X 4.2 - 1964-66, "straight port" cylinder head, painted gold, 3 × SU HD8 carburettors
 Jaguar 420 - 1966-68, 2 × SU HD8 carburettors
 Daimler Sovereign - 1966-69, 2 × SU HD8 carburettors
 Jaguar 420G - 1966-70, painted gold, 3 × SU HD8 carburettors
 Jaguar E-Type Series 1 4.2 - 1964-68, painted gold, 3 × SU HD8 carburettors (from 1967 US specification E-Types used 2 × Zenith-Stromberg 175 CDSE carburettors for reduced emissions)
 Jaguar E-Type Series 2 - 1968-70, 3 × SU HD8 carburettors (US specification E-Types used 2 × Zenith-Stromberg 175 CDSE carburettors for reduced emissions)
 Jaguar XJ6 4.2 Series 1 - 1968-73, 2 × SU HD8 carburettors (North American specification XJ6 used 2 × Zenith-Stromberg 175 CDSE carburettors for reduced emissions)
 Daimler Sovereign 4.2 'XJ6' Series 1 - 1969-73, 2 × SU HD8 carburettors
 Jaguar XJ6 4.2 Series 2 - 1973-74, 2 × SU HS8 carburettors (North American specification XJ6 used 2 × Zenith-Stromberg 175 CDSE carburettors for reduced emissions)
 Daimler Sovereign 4.2 'XJ6' Series 2 - 1973-74, 2 × SU HS8 carburettors
 Jaguar XJ6 L 4.2 Series 2 - 1973-79, 2 × SU HS8 carburettors. From 1977, 2 × SU HIF7 carburettors, US market from May 1978 Bosch-Lucas L-Jetronic electronic injection
 Daimler Sovereign LWB 4.2 'XJ6' Series 2 - 1973-79 (and Daimler Vanden Plas 1975-79), 2 × SU HS8 carburettors. From 1977, 2 × SU HIF7 carburettors, US market (VDP only) from May 1978 Bosch-Lucas L-Jetronic
 Jaguar XJ6 4.2 Series 3 - 1979-87, 2 × SU carburettors or Bosch-Lucas L-Jetronic electronic injection
 Daimler 4.2 'XJ6' Series 3 - 1979-86, 2 × SU carburettors or Bosch-Lucas L-Jetronic electronic injection
 Daimler DS420 Limousine - 1968-92, 2 × SU HD8 carburettors. From 1985 Bosch-Lucas L-Jetronic electronic injection
 Panther J.72
 Panther De Ville

It was also used in the Combat Vehicle Reconnaissance (Tracked) - CVR(T) - family of military vehicles: e.g.,
 FV101 Scorpion, a light tank
 FV107 Scimitar, an armoured reconnaissance vehicle

and the corresponding Combat Vehicle Reconnaissance (Wheeled) - CVR(W) - family: e.g., Fox armoured reconnaissance vehicle
plus the Dennis D600 fire engine.

2.8-litre

A 2.8-litre version of the XK was introduced for the entry-level XJ6 models in 1968. The power output of the 2.8 was listed as  DIN net, which cannot be directly compared with the 133 bhp SAE gross of the last of the 2.4s in the 240 Mark 2.

The 2.8 gained a bad reputation early in its career due to a tendency for excessive carbon deposits to accumulate on the piston crowns during low-speed running, which would burn through the crowns when run at higher revs. This was later cured by a switch to stronger pistons but the engine was also a mediocre performer offering no real economy benefit and it was dropped in 1973, to be replaced by the ‘new’ 3.4.

All of the 2.8-litre XK engines used the straight port head unpainted, which some sources may describe as "silver", and had ribbed cam covers.

The 2.8-litre XK6 was used in the following cars:
 XJ6 2.8 Series 1 - 1968-73, 2 × SU HD8 carburettors
 Daimler Sovereign 2.8 'XJ6' Series 1 – 1969-72, 2 × SU HD8 carburettors
 XJ6 2.8 Series 2 - 1973-74, 2 × SU HS8 carburettors

"New" 3.4-litre
Introduced in 1975 to replace the 2.8 in the entry level XJ6, the new 3.4 was not a simple revival of the original XK. However the cylinder spacing remained as the original 1948 design. With 83mm bore, the cylinders needed to line up with the combustion chambers in the cylinder head (whose centres remained as the original 1948 design right up to the end of XK-engine production.
It used a straight port head and delivered  DIN net and far superior torque to the 2.8.

The "new 3.4" used the straight port head, had ribbed cam covers and the heads were unpainted.

The "New 3.4" litre XK6 was used in the following cars:
 XJ6 3.4 Series 2 - 1975-79, ribbed cam covers, 2 × SU HS8 carburettors. From 1977, 2 × SU HIIF7 carburettors
Daimler Sovereign 'XJ6' 3.4 Series 2 – 1975-79, ribbed cam covers, 2 × SU HS8 carburettors. From 1977, 2 × SU HIIF7 carburettors
 XJ6 Series 3 - 1979-86, ribbed cam covers, 2 × SU carburettors

Cylinder head types
The following table relates XK cylinder head type to Jaguar/Daimler model and includes the paint colours applied to certain versions of the cylinder head in the 1950s and 60s.  Unpainted heads are sometimes referred to as "silver" but this is merely the natural colour of the aluminium alloy.

See also
 Jaguar AJ-V6 engine
 Jaguar V12 engine

References

External links

 Four cylinder XK engine page at the Jaguar Daimler Heritage Trust
 Six cylinder XK engine page at the Jaguar Daimler Heritage Trust
 Military version of the six cylinder XK engine page at the Jaguar Daimler Heritage Trust
 "The XK Engine" an article by Roger Bywater of AJ6 Engineering for Jaguar World magazine
 XK Performance

XK6
Gasoline engines by model
Straight-six engines